Consul (abbrev. cos.; Latin plural consules) was the title of one of the two chief magistrates of the Roman Republic, and subsequently also an important title under the Roman Empire. The title was used in other European city-states through antiquity and the Middle Ages, in particular in the Republics of Genoa and Pisa, then revived in modern states, notably in the First French Republic. The related adjective is consular, from the Latin consularis.

This usage contrasts with modern terminology, where a consul is a type of diplomat.

Roman consul

A consul held the highest elected political office of the Roman Republic (509 to 27 BC), and ancient Romans considered the consulship the highest level of the cursus honorum (an ascending sequence of public offices to which politicians aspired). Consuls were elected to office and held power for one year. There were always two consuls in power at any time.

Other uses in antiquity

Private sphere
It was not uncommon for an organization under Roman private law to copy the terminology of state and city institutions for its own statutory agents. The founding statute, or contract, of such an organisation was called lex, 'law'. The people elected each year were patricians, members of the upper class.

City-states
While many cities, including the Gallic states and the Carthaginian Republic, had a double-headed chief magistracy, another title was often used, such as the Punic sufet, Duumvir, or native styles like Meddix.

Medieval city-states, communes and municipalities

The most prominent were those of Bordeaux and Toulouse, which came to be known as jurats and capitouls, respectively. The capitouls of Toulouse were granted transmittable nobility. In many other smaller towns the first consul was the equivalent of a mayor today, assisted by a variable number of secondary consuls and jurats. His main task was to levy and collect tax.

The Dukes of Gaeta often used also the title of "consul" in its Greek form "Hypatos" (see List of Hypati and Dukes of Gaeta).

Republic of Genoa 
The city-state of Genoa, unlike ancient Rome, bestowed the title of consul on various state officials, not necessarily restricted to the highest. Among these were Genoese officials stationed in various Mediterranean ports, whose role included helping Genoese merchants and sailors in difficulties with the local authorities. Great Britain reciprocated by appointing consuls to Genoa from 1722. This institution, with its name, was later emulated by other powers and is reflected in the modern usage of the word (see Consul (representative)).

Republic of Pisa 
In addition to the Genoese Republic, the Republic of Pisa also took the form of "Consul" in the early stages of its government. The Consulate of the Republic of Pisa was the major government institution present in Pisa between the 11th and 12th centuries. Despite losing space within the government since 1190 in favor of the Podestà, for some periods of the 13th century some citizens were again elected as consuls.

French Revolution

French Republic 1799–1804

After Napoleon Bonaparte staged a coup against the Directory government in November 1799, the French Republic adopted a constitution which conferred executive powers upon three consuls, elected for a period of ten years. In reality, the first consul, Bonaparte, dominated his two colleagues and held supreme power, soon making himself consul for life (1802) and eventually, in 1804, emperor.

The office was held by:

 Napoleon Bonaparte, Emmanuel-Joseph Sieyès, Roger Ducos, provisional consuls (10 November – 12 December 1799)
 Napoleon Bonaparte (first consul), Jean-Jacques Cambacérès (second consul), Charles-François Lebrun (third consul), consuls (12 December 1799 – 18 May 1804)

Bolognese Republic, 1796
The short-lived Bolognese Republic, proclaimed in 1796 as a French client republic in the Central Italian city of Bologna, had a government consisting of nine consuls and its head of state was the Presidente del Magistrato, i.e., chief magistrate, a presiding office held for four months by one of the consuls. Bologna already had consuls at some parts of its Medieval history.

Roman Republic, 1798–1800
The French-sponsored Roman Republic (15 February 1798 – 23 June 1800) was headed by multiple consuls:
 Francesco Riganti, Carlo Luigi Costantini, Duke Bonelli-Crescenzi, Antonio Bassi, Gioacchino Pessuti, Angelo Stampa, Domenico Maggi, provisional consuls (15 February – 20 March 1798)
 Liborio Angelucci, Giacomo De Mattheis, Panazzi, Reppi, Ennio Quirino Visconti, consuls (20 March – September 1798)
 Brigi, Calisti, Francesco Pierelli, Giuseppe Rey, Federico Maria Domenico Michele, Zaccaleoni, consuls (September – 24 July 1799)

Consular rule was interrupted by the Neapolitan occupation (27 November – 12 December 1798), which installed a Provisional Government:
 Prince Giambattista Borghese, Prince Paolo-Maria Aldobrandini, Prince Gibrielli, Marchese Camillo Massimo, Giovanni Ricci (29 November 1798 - 12 December 1798)

Rome was occupied by France (11 July – 28 September 1799) and again by Naples (30 September 1799 – 23 June 1800), bringing an end to the Roman Republic.

Revolutionary Greece, 1821
Among the many petty local republics that were formed during the first year of the Greek Revolution, prior to the creation of a unified Provisional Government at the First National Assembly at Epidaurus, were:
 The Consulate of Argos (from 26 May 1821, under the Senate of the Peloponnese) had a single head of state, styled consul, 28 March 1821 – 26 May 1821: Stamatellos Antonopoulos
 The Consulate of East Greece (Livadeia) (from 15 November 1821, under the Areopagus of East Greece) was headed 1 April 1821 – 15 November 1821 by three consuls: Lambros Nakos, Ioannis Logothetis & Ioannis Filon
Note: in Greek, the term for "consul" is "hypatos" (ὕπατος), which translates as "supreme one", and hence does not necessarily imply a joint office.

Paraguay, 1813–1844
In between a series of juntas and various other short-lived regimes, the young republic was governed by "consuls of the republic", with two consuls alternating in power every 4 months:
 12 October 1813 – 12 February 1814, José Gaspar Rodríguez de Francia y Velasco
 12 February 1814 – 12 June 1814, Fulgencio Yegros y Franco de Torres
 12 June 1814 – 3 October 1814, José Gaspar Rodríguez de Francia y Velasco; he stayed on as "supreme dictator" 3 October 1814 – 20 September 1840 (from 6 June 1816 styled "perpetual supreme dictator")

After a few presidents of the Provisional Junta, there were again consuls of the republic, 14 March 1841 – 13 March 1844 (ruling jointly, but occasionally styled "first consul", "second consul"): Carlos Antonio López Ynsfrán (b. 1792 – d. 1862) + Mariano Roque Alonzo Romero (d. 1853) (the lasts of the aforementioned juntistas, Commandant-General of the Army)
Thereafter all republican rulers were styled "president".

Modern uses of the term

In modern terminology, a consul is a type of diplomat. The American Heritage Dictionary defines consul as "an official appointed by a government to reside in a foreign country and represent its interests there." The Devil's Dictionary defines Consul as "in American politics, a person who having failed to secure an office from the people is given one by the Administration on condition that he leave the country".

In most governments, the consul is the head of the consular section of an embassy, and is responsible for all consular services such as immigrant and non-immigrant visas, passports, and citizen services for expatriates living or traveling in the host country.

A less common modern usage is when the consul of one country takes a governing role in the host country.

See also
Differently named, but same function
 Captain Regent (similar modern position in San Marino's government)
 Consularis (Roman gubernatorial style)

Modern UN System 
 Consulate

Sources and references
 WorldStatesmen.org, see each present country

Specific

Ancient Roman titles
Heads of government
Heads of state
Military ranks of ancient Rome
Latin political words and phrases
Collective heads of state
Cursus honorum
Diplomats by role

cs:Konzul (antický Řím)
hr:Konzul
io:Konsulo
ku:Konsûl
sr:Конзул
tl:Konsulado